Interviews with My Lai Veterans is a 1970 American short documentary film directed by Joseph Strick featuring firsthand accounts of the My Lai Massacre. It won an Oscar at the 43rd Academy Awards in 1971 for Best Documentary (Short Subject). The Academy Film Archive preserved Interviews with My Lai Veterans in 2002.

Cast
 Richard Hammer as himself, interviewer (voice)

References

External links

1970 films
1970s short documentary films
1970 independent films
1970 war films
American independent films
American short documentary films
Best Documentary Short Subject Academy Award winners
Documentary films about the Vietnam War
Documentary films about war crimes
Films directed by Joseph Strick
Documentary films about veterans
Mỹ Lai massacre
1970s English-language films
1970s American films